Danse avec les stars: Le grand show was a special episode of the French version of Dancing with the Stars, broadcast live from Danse avec les stars - La tournée dancing tour. The episode was broadcast prime time on TF1 channel on 4 February 2017, roughly in the middle of the tour in 2017. The show was held at Zénith d'Auvergne in Clermont Ferrand.

The special show was announced after the tour had already begun, and it caused the show to be rescheduled to start 25 minutes later than originally announced to fit TF1's schedule. The show also differs from all the other shows during the tour: it had the original season 7 judges, 12 competing celebrities and the competitors competed in teams of three, with each team having different judge as their coach.

The episode had the lowest viewership out of the 62 episodes broadcast in history of Danse avec les stars. 2 980 000 viewers with 15,4 % share of the viewership on French television channels, when normally the show has roughly five million viewers with 24% share of all the viewers.

Participants
Total of 12 celebrities from five different seasons joined the show.

Scores

Couples
Each dance was scored by three judges (the coach of the competitor was excluded from the voting) and by one vote from public. Maximum score was 40 points.

Teams
For team scores each couple's individual scores were added together. Maximum for a team was 120 points.

Notes

References

Danse avec les stars

fr:Danse avec les stars#Danse avec les stars : Le grand show (2017)